Pseudocolaspis is a genus of leaf beetles in the subfamily Eumolpinae. It contains about 80 species, which are found in tropical Africa.

Species

References

Eumolpinae
Chrysomelidae genera
Beetles of Africa
Taxa named by François-Louis Laporte, comte de Castelnau